La Certosa (Italian: Isola della Certosa) is an island in the Venetian Lagoon, northern Italy. A  channel separates it from the Vignole island.

History
The island housed a community of Augustinian friars starting from 1199. After two centuries, the abandoned island was ceded to the Carthusians, the previous religious edifice being restored from 1490 to 1505. After the Napoleonic conquest of Venice, it became a military installation.

The 17th century Castello delle Polveri ("Powder Castle"), the only historical edifice remained today, has been restored from the late 1990s.

Redevelopment

In 2010, plans were revealed for a project called "Parco della Certosa", which would redevelop the abandoned island to include a public green park, a nautical center and training school, as well as restaurants, bars, nature trails and water-based sports facilities. The redevelopment is planned to be implemented in stages, with completion originally scheduled for 2015.  However, on 12 June 2012, an F2 tornado struck the island, causing major damage to the island's trees. Restoration activities began the same year. Current plans are for the first stage park to be opened to the public in 2013.

Transport
The island is served by Actv waterbus lines 4.1 (anticlockwise) and 4.2 (clockwise) that connect Murano, Ferrovia, Giudecca and S.Zaccaria. Alilaguna's Blue line also serves the island on its route (Ferrovia-Zattere-San Marco Giardinetti-Lido SME-Certosa-Hospital-Fondamente Nove-Murano-Airport).

Notes

Sources

Certosa